Király Szabadidősport Egyesület is a professional football club based in Szombathely, Vas County, Hungary. The club competes in the Vas county league.

History
The club was founded by former Hungarian international footballer Gábor Király.

External links
 Profile on Magyar Futball

References

Football clubs in Hungary
Association football clubs established in 2006
2006 establishments in Hungary